The five-lined cardinalfish, Cheilodipterus quinquelineatus, is a species of marine fish in the family Apogonidae. It is widespread throughout the tropical waters of the Indo-Pacific region, Red Sea included.  It can reach a maximum size of 13 cm in length.

References

External links
http://www.marinespecies.org/aphia.php?p=taxdetails&id=209371
 

quinquelineatus
Fish described in 1828
Taxa named by Georges Cuvier